Jack Early (born August 16, 1962) is a contemporary artist known for exploring the American identity. Early works with a Pop vocabulary combining it with biographical details and personal elements of his life. His work builds on cultural references and continues to evolve through his experience with the media and an ever-changing self. Early currently lives and works in Brooklyn, New York.

Life and work 
Early was born in 1962 in Raleigh, North Carolina, graduating from North Carolina School of the Arts. His ascent to fame began in the late 1980s as one-half of the duo Pruitt-Early, Rob Pruitt being the other half. Pruitt-Early's irreverent work challenged prevailing orthodoxies and blurred the boundaries between low culture and high art.

Their first solo show, Artwork for Teenage Boys, was held in 1990 at 303 Gallery, New York. Pruitt-Early quickly garnered attention, and in 1992 they presented an exhibition, Red, Black, Green, Red, White and Blue, at Leo Castelli Gallery. Following the Castelli show, which was misunderstood and infamously panned, Early went into self-imposed exile from the art world. In recent years, Pruitt-Early's artworks have been reappraised and increasingly hailed by collectors, critics, and museums.

Early began writing songs, which have become integral to many of his new art objects. Since 2009, he has been making objects that explore the breadth of American pop culture. Glenn O’Brien describes Early as a “new sort of bluesman…making work that reflects the lonesome road he’s been on, a road that goes through Jesus, Jesus Christ Superstar, John and Yoko, protest movements, and the United Federation of Planets.” In 2015 he released Jack Early's life story in just under 20 minutes! on vinyl.

2018-19 Recipient of the  Pollock-Krasner Foundation Grant Award

Exhibitions 
Recent exhibitions include Rainbow, Mulier Mulier Gallery, Belgium, 2017; A Better Yesterday, Contemporary Arts Museum Houston, 2017; Jack Early, Fergus McCaffrey, New York, 2016; Jack Early, The Suburban, Milwaukee, 2016; Jack Early, Fergus McCaffrey, Art Basel Miami Beach, 2014; Jack Early: WWJD, Southfirst, Brooklyn, 2012; Jack Early: Gallery Peace, McCaffrey Fine Art, New York, 2012;  Jack Early: What To Do With a Drunken Sailor, Forever and Today, New York, 2011;  Mapping the Studio: Artists from the François Pinault Collection, Palazzo Grassi, Venice 2009-11 and Pop Life: Art in a Material World, Tate Modern, London, 2009–10.

Early is currently represented by Fergus McCaffrey in New York and Mulier Mulier Gallery in Belgium.

Further reading 
Francesca Soler, "Redemption man: misunderstood artist continues his reemergence from an untimely career suicide...," We-Heart, March 21, 2016, https://www.we-heart.com/2016/03/21/jack-early-fergus-mccaffrey-new-york/

"In the Galleries: Early Pop," Advocate, March 10, 2016, http://www.advocate.com/art/2016/3/09/galleries-early-pop

Gabriel H. Sanchez, "Critics' Picks: Jack Early," Art Forum, March 4, 2016, http://artforum.com/picks/section=nyc&mode=past#picks58507

Trey Speegle, "Artist Jack Early On Growing Up Gay, Avoiding “The Odd Couple” & Crushing on David LaChapelle," World of Wonder, February 21, 2016, http://worldofwonder.net/jack-earlys-new-show-looks-at-being-a-southern-gay-boy-in-the-70s/

Kate Messinger, "Hunks and Popsicles, Artist Jack Early is Back," Paper Magazine, February 19, 2016, http://www.papermag.com/jack-early-returns-1612442093.html

Alec Coiro, "Jack Early at Fergus McCaffrey," Ravelin, February 10, 2016, http://ravelinmagazine.com/posts/jack-early-at-fergus-mccaffrey/

Jan Arsen, "Jack Early in Largest Solo Exhibition to Date Coming to Fergus McCaffrey Gallery," Widewalls, February 8, 2016, http://www.widewalls.ch/jack-early-exhibition-fergus-mccaffrey-gallery/

“Jack Early at Frieze Is Bigger Than Jesus,” New York Observer, May 9, 2013, http://observer.com/2013/05/jack-early-at-frieze-is-bigger-than-jesus/.

Paddy Johnson, Whitney Kimball, Corinna Kirsch, “7 Rising Art Stars To Watch: Jack Early,” Art F City, August 21, 2014, http://artfcity.com/2014/08/21/7-rising-art-stars-to-watch-jack-early/.

Kat Herriman, “You Don’t Know Jack,” W Magazine, November 24, 2014, http://www.wmagazine.com/culture/art-and-design/2014/11/jack-early-fergus-mccaffrey/photos/slide/1.

Elizabeth Kley, “Jack Early Forever and Today,” Artnet, 2011, http://www.artnet.com/magazineus/features/kley/jack-early-forever-and-today-11-28-11.asp.

Trong Gia Nguyen, “From the Archive: An Interview with Jack Early,” ARTslant, February 2011, http://www.artslant.com/9/articles/show/21924.

Andrew M. Goldstein “10 of the Best Artworks at Art Basel Miami Beach 2014,” Artspace, December 7, 2014, http://www.artspace.com/magazine/news_events/the-best-of-art-basel-miami-beach-2014.

Piper Marshall, “It’s Never Too Late for Jack Early,” Art in America. October 20, 2009, http://www.artinamericamagazine.com/news-features/interviews/jack-early/.

Amy Shaw, "Everything But a Unicorn: Jack Early's 'Ear Candy,'" Hyperallergic. November 6, 2009, http://hyperallergic.com/937/jack-early-ear-candy/.

References 

Living people
Modern painters
American conceptual artists
1962 births